Eve Gray (27 November 1900 – 23 May 1983) was an English film actress.

Born Fanny Evelyn Garrett, she was taken to Australia as a child and later had a stage career there. She returned to England in 1924 and within three days of arrival had signed a contract and then made her first appearance on the London stage at Daly's Theatre in Madame Pompadour. A film contract soon followed, although she continued to appear on stage in the West End in plays such as Charles Bennett's Sensation.

Partial filmography

 The Lodger: A Story of the London Fog (1927) - Showgirl Victim (uncredited)
 The Silver Lining (1927) - Lettie Deans
 Poppies of Flanders (1927) - Beryl Kingwood
 One of the Best (1927) - Mary Penrose
 The Lodger (1927)
 Moulin Rouge (1928) - Margaret
 Villa Falconieri (1928) - Princess Sora
 Smashing Through (1929) - Kitty Masters
 Sweet Pepper (1929)
 The Secret Adversary (1929) - Lucienne Fereoni
 The Loves of Robert Burns (1930) - Mary Campbell
 Why Sailors Leave Home (1930) - Slave Girl
 Night Birds (1930) - Mary Cross
 Midnight (1931, Short) - Dorothy Harding
 The Wickham Mystery (1931) - Joan Hamilton
 The Bermondsey Kid (1933) - Toots
 The Flaw (1933) - Irene Nelson
 Smithy (1933) - Daughter
 The Crimson Candle (1934) - Mavis
 Guest of Honour (1934) - Cissie Poffley
 Big Business (1934) - Sylvia Brent
 What's in a Name? (1934) - Mrs. Schultz
 Womanhood (1934) - Leila Mason
 Murder at Monte Carlo (1935) - Gilian
 Three Witnesses (1935) - Margaret Truscott
 Department Store (1935) - Dolly Flint
 Death on the Set (1935) - Laura Cane
 Man of the Moment (1935) - Miss Madden
 Scrooge (1935) - Fred's Wife
 Twice Branded (1936) - Sylvia Hamilton
 Jury's Evidence (1936) - Ruby
 They Didn't Know (1936) - Cutie
 The Last Journey (1936) - Daisy
 The Happy Family (1936) - Nia Harrison
 Such Is Life (1936) - Vicky
 Pearls Bring Tears (1937) - Pamela Vane
 Strange Adventures of Mr. Smith (1937) - Mrs. Maidie Smith
 Fifty-Shilling Boxer (1937) - Miriam Steele
 The Vicar of Bray (1937) - Meg Clancy
 The Angelus (1937) - Maisie Blake
 Silver Blaze (1937) - Mrs. Mary Straker
 When the Devil Was Well (1937) - Ann
 The Awakening (1938)
 His Lordship Regrets (1938) - Enid
 His Lordship Goes to Press (1938)
 One Good Turn (1951, Short) - Mrs. Lowery (final film role)

References

External links
 

1900 births
1983 deaths
English film actresses
Actresses from Birmingham, West Midlands
20th-century English actresses
People from Mere, Wiltshire